The Allan Cup is the trophy awarded annually to the senior ice hockey champions of Canada. It was donated by Sir Montagu Allan of Ravenscrag, Montreal, and has been competed for since 1909.  The current champions are the Lacombe Generals, who captured the 2019 Allan Cup in Lacombe, Alberta.

History
In 1908, a split occurred in the competition of ice hockey in Canada. The top amateur teams left the Eastern Canada Amateur Hockey Association, which allowed professionals, to form the new Inter-Provincial Amateur Hockey Union (IPAHU), a purely amateur league. The trustees of the Stanley Cup decided that the Cup would be awarded to the professional ice champion, meaning there was no corresponding trophy for the amateur championship of Canada. The Allan Cup was donated in early 1909 by Montreal businessman and Montreal Amateur Athletic Association president Sir H. Montagu Allan to be presented to the amateur champions of Canada. It was to be ruled like the Stanley Cup had, passed by champion to champion by league championship or challenge. Three trustees were named to administer the trophy: Sir Edward Clouston, President of the Bank of Montreal, Dr. H. B. Yates of McGill University, (donor of the Yates Cup to the Intercollegiate Rugby Union in 1898) and Graham Drinkwater, four-time Stanley Cup champion.

The trophy was originally presented to the Victoria Hockey Club of Montreal, Quebec, members of the IPAHU, to award to the champions of the IPAHU. The first IPAHU champion, and by extension, first winner of the Cup was the Ottawa Cliffsides hockey club. After the season, the Cliffsides were defeated in the first-ever challenge by the Queen's University hockey club of Kingston, Ontario.

In the early years, trustees of the Cup quickly came to appreciate the difficulties of organizing a national competition in so large a country. In 1914, at the suggestion of one of the trustees, Claude C. Robinson, the Canadian Amateur Hockey Association (CAHA) was formed as a national governing body for the sport with W. F. Taylor as its first president. One of the CAHA's first decisions, in 1915, was to replace the challenge system with a series of national playoffs. Starting in 1920, the Allan Cup champion team would represent Canada in amateur play at the Olympics and World Championships. The CAHA used the profits from Allan Cup games as a subsidy for the national team. Competition for the cup was originally a one-game format, then a two-game total goals format. In 1925, CAHA leaders Silver Quilty and Frank Sandercock, changed the format to a best-of-three series due to increased popularity of the games and demand for a longer series.

At the CAHA general meeting in March 1927, W. A. Fry requested to have the CAHA take control of the Allan Cup and its profits from the trustees, and use the funds to build amateur hockey in Canada. He felt the move justified as the CAHA had evolved and was able to manage its own affairs. His motion asked for H. Montagu Allan to donate the cup to the CAHA, and establish an Allan Cup committee which included trustee William Northey.

In February 1945, CAHA president Frank Sargent announced the cancellation of the 1945 Allan Cup playoffs. It was the first season in which the trophy was not contested since the inaugural 1909 Allan Cup. The cancellation was caused by the reluctance to travel during wartime conditions, and the players' need to work rather than playing hockey.

In 1951, the CAHA set up a "major league" of competition from the semi-pro and professional senior leagues. The leagues would no longer compete for the Allan Cup, but would compete for the new Alexander Cup. The Allan Cup would be competed for on a more purely amateur basis from teams in smaller centres of Canada. The major league concept broke up by 1953, and the Alexander Cup competition was retired after 1954.

The reigning Allan Cup champion was usually chosen to represent Canada in ice hockey at the Olympic Games or the Ice Hockey World Championships. The practice lasted from 1920 to 1964, when Father David Bauer established a permanent Canada men's national ice hockey team.

Since 1984 the Allan Cup has been competed for by teams in the Senior AAA category. Although interest in senior ice hockey has diminished over its history, the Cup retains an important place in Canadian ice hockey. The Cup championship is determined in an annual tournament held in the city or town of a host team, playing off against regional champions.

The Cup has been won by teams from every province and from Yukon, as well as by two teams from the United States which played in Canadian leagues. The city with the most Allan Cup championships is Thunder Bay with 10, including four won as Port Arthur before the city's amalgamation. The original Cup has been retired to the Hockey Hall of Fame, and a replica is presented to the champions.

Allan Cup championships

Challenges
Listed are all of the challenges of the early years of the Allan Cup, bolded are the final winner of the season.

Playoffs

Notes
{*} denotes event held in multiple locations

Most championships by province
This is a list of champions by province, territory, or state.

(*) Two championships won by teams from Lloydminster are included only in the total for Saskatchewan.

See also
 Clarkson Cup
 Hardy Cup

References

External links

 Allan Cup website 
 Hockey Canada

 
1909 establishments in Canada
Awards established in 1909
Canadian Amateur Hockey Association trophies
Canadian ice hockey trophies and awards
Hockey Canada
Senior ice hockey